Nioghalvfjerdsfjorden is a fjord located in King Frederick VIII Land, in Northeast Greenland National Park of northeastern Greenland. It is located at latitude 79° N (hence the name, which in Danish means "the fjord of seventy-nine") between Lambert Land and Hovgaard Island. The fjord was named by the Denmark expedition in April 1907. The uninhabited Tobias Island is located 80 km east of the fjord.

In September 2020, satellite imagery showed that a big chunk of ice shattered into many small pieces from the last remaining ice shelf in Nioghalvfjerdsfjorden.

See also
List of fjords of Greenland

References 

Fjords of Greenland